Stephen Wyn Roberts (born 24 February 1980) is a Welsh former professional footballer who most recently played for Walsall. He has also represented Wales at under-21 level.

Career
Roberts began his career at hometown club Wrexham, where he took part in the club's Football League Trophy win in 2005, before eventually moving to Doncaster Rovers where he joined up with his brother Neil Roberts who eventually moved on to join Wrexham.

On 1 July 2008, Roberts opted to turn down a new one-year contract at Doncaster Rovers, to drop down to League One to play for Walsall on a two-year contract. He became the "Saddlers" first signing of the 2008 pre-season.

On 8 October 2009, Roberts announced his retirement from the game at the age of 29 due to a persistent back injury.

References

External links

1980 births
Living people
Footballers from Wrexham
Welsh footballers
Wales under-21 international footballers
Wales international footballers
Association football defenders
Wrexham A.F.C. players
Doncaster Rovers F.C. players
Walsall F.C. players
English Football League players